The River Class is a ferry type operated by Transdev Sydney Ferries on Sydney Harbour.

History

In September 2017, Transport for NSW called for expressions of interest for four new ferries for Parramatta River ferry services. However, after the bids were higher than expected, the project was shelved.

Upon being awarded the contract to operate the Sydney Ferries concession in 2019, Transdev Sydney Ferries placed an order for 10 new ferries to be built in Indonesia.

The first four arrived in Newcastle in August 2020 for final works and trials. The ferries were purchased to replace the SuperCat and HarbourCat-class Ferries. All were named after artists, athletes and authors.

The first entered service in October 2021, confined to daytime service until deemed suitable for night time operations.

In late 2022 the government announced it was looking for tenders to build a new fleet of RiverClass to replace the RiverCat-class Ferries

Delays
Identified defects on the ferries include asbestos, sub-standard fit and finish, wheelhouse window angles making night operations dangerous, engine stalling, potential of fires or electrocution caused by sub standard electrical equipment/cabling and sub-standard steering components. Rectifying these issues have pushed the in service date out by over a year.

Vessels

References

External links

Catamarans
Ferry classes
Ferry transport in Sydney